The 1956 Michigan Wolverines football team was an American football team that represented the University of Michigan in the 1956 Big Ten Conference football season. In their ninth year under head coach was Bennie Oosterbaan, the Wolverines compiled a 7–2 record (5–2 Big Ten), outscored opponents 233 to 123, and finished the season in second place in the Big Ten Conference and ranked No. 7 in the final 1956 AP poll. The team played five of its nine games against ranked opponents, losing to No. 2 Michigan State by a 9–0 score and No. 15 Minnesota by a 20–7 score, but defeating No. 15 Army by a 48–14 score, No. 7 Iowa by a 17–14 score, and No. 12 Ohio State by a 19–0 score.

End Ron Kramer was selected as a consensus All-American and a first team All-Big Ten player. Guard Dick Hill was selected as the team's Most Valuable Player and was named by the Associated Press (AP) as a first-team All-Big Ten player. Halfback Terry Barr averaged 6.1 yards per carry rushing and 19.7 yards per punt return and was selected as a first-team All-Big Ten player by the United Press (UP).

Schedule

Game summaries

Game 1: UCLA

On September 29, 1956, Michigan opened its season with a 42–13 victory over UCLA. The Bruins were ranked #4 in the final AP Poll in 1955, but lost a number of players due to sanctions imposed by the Pacific Coast Conference. Michigan rushed for 234 yards against UCLA, including 67 yards by junior halfback Jim Pace. In the air, Michigan completed four of nine passes for 103 yards, including a 13-yard touchdown pass from Bob Ptacek to Jim Van Pelt and a 70-yard touchdown pass from Terry Barr to Ron Kramer. Barr also set up a touchdown with a 51-yard punt return to the UCLA 15-yard line in the first quarter. Halfback John Herrnstein scored two touchdowns for Michigan on runs of six and four yards. Ed Shannon and Jim Dickey also scored touchdowns for Michigan. Kramer and Maddock each kicked three extra points for Michigan.

Game 2: Michigan State

On October 6, 1956, Michigan (ranked No. 5 in the AP Poll) lost to Michigan State (ranked No. 2), 9–0, before a crowd of 101,001 at Michigan Stadium. After a scoreless first half in which Michigan dominated statistically, turnovers led to two Michigan State scores. In the third quarter, John Herrnstein was intercepted at Michigan's 38-yard line, setting up a 20-yard field goal by John Matsko. In the fourth quarter, Herrnstein fumbled, and Michigan State recovered the ball at Michigan's 21-yard line, leading to a Spartan touchdown shortly thereafter.

Game 3: Army

On October 13, 1956, Michigan (ranked No. 12 in the AP Poll) defeated Army (ranked No. 15), 48–14, before a crowd of 93,101 at Michigan Stadium. Army fumbled eight times with Michigan recovering six times. Michigan led, 27-0, at halftime, and none of Michigan's starters played in the second half. Michigan totaled 246 rushing yards and 124 passing yards. Seven different Wolverines scored touchdowns: Jim Pace, Terry Barr, Bob Ptacek, Gary Prahst, John Herrnstein, Jim Van Pelt, and Jim Maddock.

Game 4: Northwestern

On October 20, 1956, Michigan (ranked No. 8 in the AP Poll) defeated Northwestern, 34–20, before a crowd of 81,227 at Michigan Stadium. John Herrnstein scored three touchdowns. Jim Maddock scored on a 15-yard pass from Bob Ptacek, and Ron Kramer also scored on a 15-yard pass from Terry Barr. Michigan totaled 283 rushing yards and 156 passing yards.

Game 9: Ohio State
On November 24, Michigan defeated Ohio State, 19-0, before a crowd of 82,223 in Columbus, Ohio. Senior back Terry Barr, playing in his final game for Michigan, scored two touchdowns. Quarterback Jim Maddock also scored a touchdown. Ron Kramer converted one of three extra point kicks. On defense, the Wolverines allowed only one completed pass and intercepted two.

Players

Varsity letter winners
The following players won varsity letters for their participation on the 1956 Michigan football team. Players who started at least half of Michigan's games are shown in bold.
Terry Barr, halfback, senior, Grand Rapids, Michigan – started 7 games at right halfback
 Thomas E. Berger, guard, junior, Detroit
 Alex Bochnowski, guard, junior, Munster, Indiana
 David C. Bowers, end, junior, Traverse City, Michigan
 Charles Books, end, senior, Marshall, Michigan
 James Byers, fullback, sophomore, Evansville, Indiana
 Clement Corona, guard, senior, Berwick, Pennsylvania
 James H. Davies, tackle, senior, Muskegon Heights, Michigan
 James A. Dickey, fullback, junior, Miamisburg, Ohio
 Lawrence Faul, guard, junior, River Forest, Illinois
 John Greenwood, halfback, senior, Bay City, Michigan
John Herrnstein, fullback, sophomore, Chillicothe, Ohio – started 9 games at fullback
 Richard B. Heynen, tackle, senior, Grand Rapids, Michigan
Dick Hill, guard, sophomore, Gary, Indiana – started 9 games at left guard
 Walter N. Johnson, end, sophomore, Dearborn, Michigan
Ron Kramer, end, senior, East Detroit, Michigan – started 9 games at left end
 Jack Lousma, quarterback, sophomore, Ann Arbor, Michigan
 Jim Maddock, quarterback, senior, Chicago
Tom Maentz, end, senior, Holland, Michigan – started 9 games at right end
 Jerry Marciniak, fullback, sophomore, Chicago
 Marvin R. Nyren, guard, junior, Des Plaines, Illinois – started 9 games at right guard
 James B. Orwig, tackle, senior, Toledo, Ohio – started 9 games at left tackle
Jim Pace, halfback, junior, Little Rock, Arkansas – started 7 games at left halfback
 Gary Prahst, end, sophomore, Berea, Ohio
 Bob Ptacek, halfback, sophomore, Cleveland – started 2 games at left halfback
 David F. Rentschler, halfback, junior, Detroit
 Mike Rotunno, center, senior, Canton, Ohio – started 8 games at center
 Edward J. Shannon, running back, senior, River Forest, Illinois – started 2 games at right halfback
 Michael Shatusky, halfback, senior, Menominee, Michigan
 Lionel Albert Sigman, tackle, senior, Ann Arbor, Michigan – started 9 games at right tackle
 Eugene Sisinyak, fullback, sophomore, Monroe, Michigan
 Willie Smith, tackle, sophomore, Little Rock, Arkansas – tackle
 Eugene "Gene" Snider, center, junior, Hamtramck, Michigan – started 1 game at center
 John Spidel, quarterback, sophomore, Greenville, Ohio
Jim Van Pelt, quarterback, junior, Evanston, Illinois – started 9 games at quarterback
 Raymond L. Wine, center, sophomore, Port Huron, Michigan

Awards and honors
Captain: Tom Maentz
All-Americans: Ron Kramer
All-Conference: Ron Kramer, Dick Hill, Terry Barr
Most Valuable Player: Dick Hill
Meyer Morton Award: John Herrnstein
John Maulbetsch Award: John Herrnstein

Statistical leaders

Rushing

Passing

Receiving

Kickoff returns

Punt returns

Coaching staff
Head coach: Bennie Oosterbaan
Assistant coaches:
 Backfield: Don Robinson
 Line: Jack Blott, assisted by Don Dufek
 Ends: Matt Patanelli
 Freshmen: Wally Weber
 Scout: Pete Kinyon
 Others: Bob Hollway, Cliff Keen 
Trainer: Jim Hunt
Manager: Dave Lundquist

References

External links
 1956 Football Team -- Bentley Historical Library, University of Michigan Athletics History

Michigan
Michigan Wolverines football seasons
Michigan Wolverines football